Saint-Just-Saint-Rambert is a commune in the Loire department in central France.

Saint-Just-Saint-Rambert was created in 1973 by the merger of two former communes: Saint-Just-sur-Loire and Saint-Rambert-sur-Loire.

Population
The population data given in the table and graph below for 1954 and earlier refer to the former commune of Saint-Rambert-sur-Loire.

Twin towns
Saint-Just-Saint-Rambert is twinned with:
  Târgu Neamț, Romania, since 1999

See also
Communes of the Loire department

References

Communes of Loire (department)
Forez